Bkeftine is a village in Koura District of Lebanon. The population is   Greek Orthodox  and other confessions. In 2004 there were 941 residents, of whom 602 were registered voters but just 380 actually voted in the municipal elections.

References

 

Eastern Orthodox Christian communities in Lebanon
Populated places in the North Governorate
Koura District